This is a list of actors from Bhojpuri cinema.

A
 Awdhesh Mishra

B
 Biraj Bhatta

D
 Dinesh Lal Yadav

K
 Khesari Lal Yadav
 Kamaal R. Khan
 Kunal Singh
 Kranti Prakash Jha
 KK Goswami
 Krushna Abhishek

M
 Manoj Tiger
 Manoj Tiwari
 Manoj Bhawuk

N
 Nazir Hussain

P
 Pawan Singh
 Pradeep Pandey

R
 Ravi Kishan
 Ritesh Pandey
 Rishabh Kashyap
 Rakesh Pandey

S
 Sikandar Kharbanda
 Sanjay Pandey
 Sujit Kumar

V
 Vinay Anand

Y
 Yash Kumarr

Note
Apart from these regular actors, many Bollywood actors like Amitabh Bachchan, Abhishek Bachchan, Ajay Devgn, Rahul Roy, Dharmendra, Kader Khan, Mithun Chakraborty, Jackie Shroff, and Raj Babbar,  Rahul Dev, have acted in Bhojpuri movies.

See also
Bhojpuri cinema
List of Bhojpuri people
List of Bhojpuri actresses
List of Bhojpuri singers
List of Bihari singers

References

Bhojpuri cinema
Indian film actors